Izabella Krizia Dayot Marquez, more popularly known as Zia Marquez (born May 10, 1992), is a Filipina actress.  She is currently a member of ABS-CBN's elite circle of homegrown talents collectively known as Star Magic.

Biography

Background 
Izabella Krizia Dayot Marquez is the second daughter of actor Joey Marquez with former actress and producer Brenda del Rio.  She is the sister of former child star Jowee Ann Marquez and half siblings are Jeremy Marquez and Winwyn Marquez.  She is a niece of Miss International Melanie Marquez.

Career
Zia had a taste of show business when she joined Ang TV 2 with her sister, Jowee Ann, in 2000.  As a child star she has appeared in ABS-CBN shows like Maalaala Mo Kaya and Pangako Sa Yo.

In 2006, she was relaunched as a member of Star Magic Batch 13.  Now at her teens, Zia is more zealous than ever to carve a name in Philippine Showbiz.  Aside from being an actress she has also thought of following in her aunt, Melanie Marquez's footsteps as a model and beauty queen.

Filmography

References

External links
 
 Showbiz Blood in Star Magic Batch 13

Filipino people of Indian descent
1992 births
Filipino child actresses
Living people
Star Magic